Clairemont High School is a public high school serving grades 9-12. It is located in the community of Clairemont Mesa, San Diego, California, United States. It is part of the San Diego Unified School District. The campus is situated close to the intersection of Balboa Avenue and Clairemont Drive. It is accredited by the Western Association of Schools and Colleges.

History
The school is named after the Clairemont community in which it is located.

When Clairemont opened its doors in 1958, it consisted of no senior class, a junior class (class of 1960) consisting mostly of transfers from Mission Bay High School in nearby Pacific Beach and Kearny High School, and a sophomore class (class of 1961) coming from its neighbor, Marston Junior High. There was no freshman class.

Ritchie Valens, who at the time had two hits on the charts, "La Bamba" and "Donna," played at Clairemont High School's opening.

On December 18, 1970, Mason Williams ('Classical Gas') performed benefit concerts for the Pala Indian Reservation Cultural Center hosted by Clairemont High School. Organized by the ASB, Mr. Wallazz 'Wally' Eaton (ASB advisor) and sponsored by the nonprofit 'Americans for Indian Future and Tradition,' Williams performed two shows -- one during the day for the students and an evening show for the general public. The event was a success and raised $1400 -- enough funds at that time to pay for the block walls. Local TV news and the Sentinel newspaper were on campus to report the award of the donation to elders of the tribe by the ASB president on behalf of CHS and AIFT. Today, the Cupa Cultural Center remains an integral part of the Pala Indian Reservation in northern San Diego County. A plaque at the Center lists Clairemont High School as a contributor.  

Mary Catherine Swanson started the AVID program at Clairemont High in 1980 with 32 students.

Sports

In 1971, the Chieftain Harriers won the CIF Championship a second year in a row with a 12-0 record to win the Western League Title with their star runner, Dave Harper. Coach Aaron York estimated to train for that season, the team ran over a thousand miles. 

In 2014 Clairemont's varsity softball team won the CIF Division III title by defeating Brawley 3-0. 

In 2017 both Boys and Girls Water Polo teams won CIF. Boys won Division II and Girls won Division I. 

Clairemont has a variety of sports teams. The most attended game is football. The last time the football team won CIF was in 1981. The team made the playoffs in 1962, 1991, 1994, 2004, 2006, 2009, 2012, and 2019.

Clairemont has a long distance running tradition and won CIF championships in girls' cross country in 2009 and 2010.

Clairemont's mascot is the Chieftain, the school newspaper is The Arrow', and the annual is The Calumet (which is a ceremonial pipe used for special occasions by early native American tribes).

In popular culture
The movie Fast Times at Ridgemont High (and the book published first) were inspired by author Cameron Crowe's undercover research at Clairemont High School during the 1978-79 school year.

A track on the band Pierce the Veil's album Selfish Machines is titled "Fast Times at Clairemont High".

Notable alumni
 Barbara Haskell, class of 1964, curator of the Whitney Museum of American Art, 1975–present
 Ken Henderson, Class of 1964 former Major League Baseball player, 1965-1980
 Luís Alberto Urrea, class of 1973, poet, novelist, and essayist
 Kris Jenner, class of 1973, stars on reality TV show Keeping Up with the Kardashians Kelly Ward, class of 1974, actor, played Putzie in the film Grease Jennifer Batten, class of 1975, solo guitarist, toured with Jeff Beck and Michael Jackson
 Mike Winters, class of 1976, Major League Baseball umpire, 1990–present
 Mo Gaffney, class of 1976, actress and comedian
 Thomas A. Shannon Jr., class of 1976, Assistant Secretary of State
 Bob Geren, class of 1979, baseball player, former manager of the Oakland Athletics and bench coach of the New York Mets is currently the major league bench coach under Dave Roberts for the Los Angeles Dodgers
 Andy Rathbone, class of 1979, author of a number of ...for Dummies books about Microsoft Windows, as well as other computing books 
 Casey Nicholaw, class of 1980, actor, Directed, Choreographed, and performed in multiple musicals
 David Oliver, class of 1980, actor, Another World, A Year in the Life, and 21 Jump Street Kristen R. Ghodsee, class of 1988, writer and professor
 Aaron and Adam Weis, class of 1999, child actors and teachers
 Vic Fuentes, class of 2001, Lead singer and guitarist in band, Pierce The Veil
 Mike Fuentes, class of 2002, Drummer in band, Pierce The Veil
 Kendra Wilkinson, class of 2003, Playboy'' model and reality-television personality
 Moala Tautuaa, class of 2008, professional basketball player.
 Kevin Mitchell, baseball player and 1989 National League MVP, San Francisco Giants
 Tony Muser, former Major League Baseball manager.
 Chris Bonner, former College and AFL Football Player.

References

External links
 Clairemont High School website

Clairemont, San Diego
Educational institutions established in 1960
High schools in San Diego
Public high schools in California
1960 establishments in California